Joseph Goosby, Jr. (born September 6, 1986) is a professional American football linebacker who is currently a free agent. In college, he played for Tulane University.

Professional career
In 2009, Goosby was a member of the Bossier-Shreveport Battle Wings. In 2010, he played for the San Angelo Stampede Express of the Indoor Football League. In 2011, he was signed by the Dallas Vigilantes. On September 28, 2011, he was signed by the Philadelphia Soul. He was named Riddell Co-Defensive Player of the Week after his performance against the Georgia Force winning 92-42. On August 26, 2016, the Soul beat the Arizona Rattlers in ArenaBowl XXIX by a score of 56–42.

On January 31, 2017, Goosby was selected by the Baltimore Brigade in the 2017 expansion draft. On February 23, 2017, the Brigade traded Goosby to the Soul for future considerations and claim order positioning. He earned Second Team All-Arena honors in 2017. On August 26, 2017, the Soul beat the Tampa Bay Storm in ArenaBowl XXX by a score of 44–40.

Personal
Son of Sharon and Joe. Graduated from Tulane with a degree in Media Arts.

References

External links
 Tulane Green Wave bio
 NFL Draft Scout Report

Tulane Green Wave football players
Bossier–Shreveport Battle Wings players
San Angelo Stampede Express players
Dallas Vigilantes players
Philadelphia Soul players
1986 births
Living people
Players of American football from Texas
Sportspeople from Harris County, Texas
Baltimore Brigade players